Janbaz Mirza (born Mirza Ghulam Nabi Janbaz) was a writer, poet, and journalist from Pakistan. He played a role in the Pakistan Movement and was the leader and official historian of the Majlis-e-Ahrar-ul-Islam party. He joined the Ahrar Party in 1932. After  the partition of India in 1947, he started to publish the weekly newspaper Tabsarah. He wrote Karvan-e-Ahrar, an eight-volume series of the history of the Indian subcontinent.

See also
 List of Pakistani journalists

References

Pakistani editors
Muhajir people
Pakistan Movement activists
Secretary Generals of Majlis-e-Ahrar-ul-Islam
People from Lahore